The Bounty is a 1984 British historical drama film directed by Roger Donaldson, starring Mel Gibson and Anthony Hopkins, and produced by Bernard Williams with Dino De Laurentiis as executive producer. It is the fifth film version of the story of the mutiny on the Bounty. The supporting cast features Laurence Olivier, Daniel Day-Lewis, Liam Neeson and Edward Fox.

The screenplay by Robert Bolt was based on the book Captain Bligh and Mr Christian (1972) by Richard Hough. The film was made by Dino De Laurentiis Productions and Bounty Productions Ltd. and distributed by Orion Pictures Corporation and Thorn EMI Screen Entertainment. The music score was composed by Vangelis and the cinematography designed by Arthur Ibbetson.

Plot 

Bligh sets out from England in December 1787, electing to sail the Bounty west round the tip of South America in an attempt to use the expedition to fulfill an ambition to circumnavigate the globe. The attempt to round Cape Horn fails due to harsh weather, and the ship is obliged to take the longer eastern route. Finally arriving in Tahiti in October 1788, Bligh finds that due to the delays, the wind is against them for a quick return journey and they must stay on the island for four months longer than planned.

During their stay in Tahiti, ship discipline becomes problematic. Many of the crew develop a taste for the easy pleasures that island life offers, especially the native women, making the relationship with their Captain tense. Bligh, at the same time, subjects the crew to pressure, eventually reaching breaking point when some members become intent on staying on the island. When the ship leaves Tahiti, Fletcher is forced to leave his native wife, Mauatua, behind.

The resumption of naval discipline on the return voyage turns Bligh into a tyrant not willing to tolerate any disobedience whatsoever, creating an atmosphere of tension and violence. Bligh insists that the ship is dirty and orders the crew to clean up several times a day. Many of the men, including Christian, are singled out for tongue-lashings by Bligh.

Playing on Christian's resentment against Bligh's treatment of both him and the men, the more militant members of the crew finally persuade Christian to take control of the ship. Bligh is roused from his bed and arrested, along with those considered loyal to him, and they are forced into a ship's boat, minimally supplied, and cast adrift. The film follows both the efforts of Fletcher Christian to get his men beyond the reach of British punishment and the epic voyage of Bligh to get his loyalists safely to the Dutch East Indies in a longboat.

Bligh, through courage and excellent seamanship, and a return of his good character and leadership qualities, successfully manages to reach civilisation after a very harrowing journey without navigational charts or firearms. One man, however, is killed by natives as the crew stop for supplies on a hostile island. Bligh is portrayed as a man who, on the one hand takes his sense of discipline and command too far, exceeding the limits of the ship's company, but whose character ultimately successfully protects his loyal non-mutineers and guides their overcrowded boat to safety.

The mutineers sail back to Tahiti to collect their wives, girlfriends and native friends. King Tynah, however, is concerned that their presence on the island could incite King George to declare war against Tahiti and his people. Realising the folly of staying, the mutineers gather supplies and sail away to try to find a safe refuge. Christian pleads with Tynah to allow Mauatua to decide her own destiny. Tynah concedes, and Mauatua chooses the uncertainty of a life with Christian over remaining with her father.

The search for a safe haven is long and seemingly impossible, as they realise that any pursuing Royal Navy vessels will search all known islands and coastlines to find them. At this point, those who remained on board the Bounty are so frustrated that they are ready to rebel against Christian to turn the ship back towards Tahiti. After Christian forces the crew to continue on, they eventually find Pitcairn Island, a place which Christian realises is not marked on British maps of the region.

As the crew of the Bounty burn the ship to keep it from being found (as well as to motivate the crew to tough it out on the island), the judgment of Bligh's court-martial is read: Bligh is found not to have been responsible for the loss of the Bounty, and is commended for the voyage of the open boat. Meanwhile, Fletcher Christian and his men realise that they will never go back home to England.

Cast 

 Mel Gibson as Master's Mate Fletcher Christian
 Anthony Hopkins as Lieutenant William Bligh
 Laurence Olivier as Admiral Hood
 Edward Fox as Captain Greetham
 Daniel Day-Lewis as Sailing Master John Fryer
 Bernard Hill as William Cole
 Phil Davis as Edward Young (as Philip Davis)
 Liam Neeson as Seaman Charles Churchill
 Wi Kuki Kaa as King Tynah
 Tevaite Vernette as Mauatua
 Philip Martin Brown as Seaman John Adams
 Simon Chandler as David Nelson
 Malcolm Terris as Dr. John Huggan
 John Sessions as John Smith
 Andrew Wilde as Seaman William McCoy
 Neil Morrissey as Seaman Matthew Quintal
 Richard Graham as John Mills
 Dexter Fletcher as Seaman Thomas Ellison
 Pete Lee-Wilson as William Purcell
 Jon Gadsby as John Norton
 Barry Dransfield as Michael Byrne
 Steve Fletcher as Seaman James Valentine
 Jack May as Prosecuting Captain

Production

Development

David Lean
This version was originally a longstanding project of director David Lean and his frequent collaborator, Robert Bolt. They started working on a script in Bora Bora in October 1977.

Lean and Bolt decided to make two films. One named The Lawbreakers that dealt with the voyage out to Tahiti and the subsequent mutiny, and the second which was to have been named The Long Arm, a study of the journey and the mutineers after the mutiny, as well as the admiralty's response in sending out the frigate .

In November 1977 producer Dino De Laurentiis announced he would finance the project and make it after his version of the Hurricane. Phil Kellogg was to produce the films. In December of that year, Paramount announced they would finance and distribute.

The intention was to shoot the film in Tahiti, where De Laurentiis had built a large facility for shooting Hurricane, including a brand-new hotel.

While working on the script, Lean directed a documentary, Lost and Found: The Story of Cook's Anchor, about discovering an anchor that belonged to a ship of Captain Cook.

In August 1978 Lean said he expected each film to cost $25 million. "With the high brow critics you're as good as dead if you spend that sort of money on a film", he said. "For that kind of money, the argument runs, anyone should be able to make a good picture. Which is absolute rubbish."

A replica of The Bounty was built in New Zealand. A script was finished by November 1978. Bernard Williams became attached as producer. He says Lean and De Laurentiis assumed both films could be made for $40 million in total, but Williams budgeted The Lawbreakers alone at $40 million. De Laurentiis decided he could not afford to proceed. "Dino is no longer behind the project", said Kellogg in November, adding "The first script is finished and the second is underway. I expect the pictures to go in about a year by now and we'll make them back to back."

On 12 April 1979 Bolt suffered a massive heart attack, followed by a stroke two days later, with the second script incomplete.

In August 1979 Anthony Hopkins announced Lean had asked him to play Bligh.

They looked at making the project as a seven-part TV series. Paramount were interested but decided to pull out after two months feeling the project was too "masculine" and lacked female interest.

Lean tried to interest Sam Spiegel who persuaded the director to make just the one film. Lean had a go at the script himself.

Lean was ultimately forced to abandon the project after overseeing casting and the construction of the Bounty replica which cost $4 million. In June 1981 the producer was trying to sell the replica.

"It was three years' work wasted", said Lean later. "And the sad part is, it was the best script I've ever had. It was really a cracker it would have made a marvellous film. But after all that work they pulled the rug from under me."

De Laurentiis did not want to lose the millions he had already put into the project—$2 million in development costs plus the cost of the ship—and looked for another director.

Roger Donaldson
Donaldson was an Australian who had forged a career as director in New Zealand with Sleeping Dogs and Smash Palace. The latter was the first New Zealand film to obtain a distributor in the US. Donaldson said he met with de Laurentiis to discuss filming a sequel to Conan the Barbarian. Donaldson worked on a new script for that film. "Some time during that period I mentioned that I thought The Bounty sounded like an interesting project", Donaldson said. "Well, when I finished with the Conan script, he didn't really like it so I figured, well, I'm finished with Dino."

The producer then offered him The Bounty despite not having seen any of the director's films and the fact that his biggest budget to date had been $1 million. (De Laurentiis later says he gave Donaldson the job on the basis of Smash Palace.)

"Making the movie was something that, initially, I wasn't sure I wanted to do", said Donaldson. "I thought it might be perceived as some sort of a remake. But I looked at it and decided I'd do it as long as I could do something completely on my own, not a remake at all, but based much more on fact—something to set the record straight."
 
"I saw it as an intense personal drama about two friends who have a tragic and violent falling out—a drama in which your sympathies change as events change", Donaldson said. "When you leave the movie, I hope that deep down you feel that you've understood a relationship between two men."

Casting
Anthony Hopkins was one of two actors considered for the role of Captain Bligh by David Lean. The other was Oliver Reed. Hopkins was approached as early as 1978.

In April 1980, when David Lean was still attached, Christopher Reeve was the favorite to play Fletcher Christian. Lean had enjoyed Superman and Katharine Hepburn had recommended Reeve to Lean. "It's not a remake", said Reeve. "The other versions were just remakes of the first movie. This is the true story based on the diaries of those actually on the Bounty and from the trial of the mutineers. It's the best screenplay I've ever read and it would be an honor and a privilege to accept the part of Christian."

Reeve stayed on the project through the change in director. However he dropped out at the last minute and was replaced by Mel Gibson. Gibson was looking for a project after The Night of the Running Man at MGM was cancelled. "I liked the idea they were going to show Bligh and Christian as the young men they were", said Gibson. "I also liked the idea of playing a role that Errol Flynn first attempted."

The role of Peter Heywood (who inspired the character 'Roger Byam' in the novel and earlier film versions) was originally intended to be played by Hugh Grant.

Tevaite Vernette was spotted at Papeete Airport and offered the female lead. She had to be persuaded and only agreed to play the lead once filming began.

Filming
Filming started 25 April 1983. The final script was completed only the day before filming began.

The film was shot on location over 20 weeks in Mo'orea, French Polynesia, Port of Gisborne, New Zealand and at the Old Royal Naval College and the Reform Club, Pall Mall, London. Many of the shots of the ship were filmed in Opunohu Bay, Moorea, the bay where Captain James Cook anchored during 1777. Below-the-deck scenes were shot at Lee Studios outside London.

The replica of the Bounty used in the film was built in Whangarei, New Zealand before the script was even completed at a cost of $4 million; the entire film cost $25 million. Donaldson said the boat "has got to be the most expensive movie prop ever built. It's exact right down to the hand stitching on the sails."

The director says filming on the ship was hard. "It's only 90 feet long and its design is archaic. So it rolled all the time and people were constantly seasick. It wasn't a pleasant experience."

However, unlike many other films filmed on water, The Bounty was finished under budget.

As well as the New Zealand-built Bounty, Lean had also looked at refitting the frigate Rose to play the role of Pandora. The latter has since gone on to become HMS Surprise in Peter Weir's Master and Commander. For the storm sequences a detailed 25-foot model of the Bounty was built.

Gibson described the making of the film as difficult because of the long production time and bad weather: "I went mad. They would hold their breath at night when I went off. One night I had a fight in a bar and the next day they had to shoot only one side of my face because the other was so messed up. If you see the film, you can see the swelling in certain scenes." Anthony Hopkins, who had battled with alcoholism until becoming abstinent in 1975, was worried about Gibson's heavy drinking, saying, "Mel is a wonderful, wonderful fellow with a marvellous future. He's already something of a superstar, but he's in danger of blowing it unless he takes hold of himself." Gibson, who likewise self-identified as an alcoholic, agreed with this concern, and added his admiration for the Welsh actor: "He was terrific. He was good to work with because he was open and he was willing to give. He's a moral man, and you could see this. I think we had the same attitudes."

Donaldson said Hopkins "became Bligh" during filming. "So much so that you didn't want to sit with him at breakfast."

Donaldson admits he and Hopkins clashed during filming. "I'm a bit of a hard task-master", admitted Donaldson later. "I won't give up until I really think we've wrung everything we can out of every scene... It was 90 degrees in Tahiti and the humidity was 100%, and Tony was wearing this wool-serge uniform, done up to the neck. That was demanding, just physically."

Music
The score was composed by Vangelis. The soundtrack has never been officially released, but a two-CD limited edition bootleg was released by One World Music (OWM-95034) in 1995. The score for the tracks "Opening Titles" and "Closing Titles" were remade for the compilation album Themes released in 1989 by Polydor Records.

Release
The Bounty was screened out of competition as the closing film at the 1984 Cannes Film Festival on 23 May. It was released in the United States by Orion Pictures on 4 May 1984 and in the United Kingdom on 5 October 1984 by Thorn EMI Screen Entertainment.
Upon theatrical release in the U.K., the film received a 15 certificate rating.

Home media
The Bounty was released in the U.S. in 1984 and again in 1994 on the LaserDisc format.
The film was released as a special-edition DVD in the United Kingdom in March 2002 by Sanctuary with five extra features, including separate audio commentaries, first by the director Roger Donaldson, producer Bernie Williams and production designer John Graysmarkand and solo commentary by maritime historian Stephen Walters, a fifty-two-minute 'making of' documentary narrated by Edward Fox, The Bounty on Film discussing the various Bounty films, original theatrical trailer and booklet. In the United States Twilight Time released a limited-edition Blu-ray on 10 March 2015 with little in terms of bonus material; however, it features an isolated score track by Vangelis. A special-edition DVD and Blu-ray with the same special features as the 2002 issue was released in Australia by Via Vision Entertainment on 5 December 2018.
On 2 January 2019 a Blu-ray was issued in the U.S. and Canada by Kino Lorber Studio Classic with the commentary tracks, Original theatrical trailer and image gallery.

Differences from earlier versions 
The first version, an Australian silent film, The Mutiny of the Bounty, was made in 1916. The second, In the Wake of the Bounty (1933) was another Australian production, starring Errol Flynn in his film debut, portraying Fletcher Christian.

The third and most famous version, Mutiny on the Bounty (1935), starred Charles Laughton, Clark Gable and Franchot Tone. The fourth, a remake of the third film, released in 1962, starred Marlon Brando, Trevor Howard and Richard Harris.

The most recent film, starring Mel Gibson, is generally regarded as more revisionist as well as a more historically accurate depiction of the mutiny than the two earlier film versions. According to director Donaldson, "The major difference between our film and the other versions is that none of the others pointed out that Bligh and Christian were friends. They'd made voyages together before they sailed on the Bounty. And while they were on the Bounty, Bligh demoted another officer and promoted Christian, who was at that stage nothing but a midshipman, and made him second in command. What interested me was to explore how their relationship deteriorated from that point to where Christian leads a mutiny against Bligh." Unlike earlier versions, this film did not portray Bligh as a villainous character. According to Gibson, "It was a kind of fresh look at Captain Bligh, and I think of all the renditions of who Bligh was, his was probably the closest. His Bligh was stubborn and didn't suffer fools, but he was brilliant and just had a lot of bad luck."
The Bounty also paints a far less heroic portrait of Christian. In Gibson's description, "Fletcher was just a lad of twenty-two and he behaved like one. The first time he decided to test his horns and fight for the herd, it was a mistake. He shouldn't have done it." Gibson later expressed the opinion that the film did not go far enough in correcting the historical record."I think the main problem with that film was that it tried to be a fresh look at the dynamic of the mutiny situation, but didn't go far enough. In the old version, Captain Bligh was the bad guy and Fletcher Christian was the good guy. But really Fletcher Christian was a social climber and an opportunist. They should have made him the bad guy, which indeed he was. He ended up setting all these people adrift to die, without any real justification. Maybe he'd gone island crazy. They should have painted it that way. But they wanted to exonerate Captain Bligh while still having the dynamic where the guy was mutinying for the good of the crew. It didn't quite work." The film also portrays the sailors exploiting the islanders. Unlike the earlier film versions, the native women are shown (accurately) totally bare-breasted. Gibson said, "It was a complete culture shock and it was unbelievable to them. It was paradise in terms of personal freedoms—freedoms that shouldn't have been taken advantage of. They exploited the people, fooled them and didn't tell them the whole truth". Gibson chose to suddenly erupt in violent emotion during the mutiny scene because eyewitness accounts had described Christian as 'extremely agitated' and 'sweating and crying'.

Reception

Box office
The Bounty grossed $8.6 million in the United States and Canada, and $9.7 million in other territories, for a total worldwide gross of $18.3 million, against a production budget of $20 million. In the U.S. and Canada the film grossed $2,622,306 in its opening weekend in 986 theatres.

Critical response 
The film received generally favourable reviews, many liking the film for realism and historical accuracy as well as being entertaining. On the aggregate site Rotten Tomatoes it has received a 74% rating from 19 critical reviews with an average rating of 6.28/10. The website's critical consensus reads, "Thanks in large part to its cast, and Anthony Hopkins in particular, The Bounty's retelling of the mutiny on the HMS Bounty is an intelligent, engaging adventure saga." Roger Ebert gave the film four stars out of four, stating, "this Bounty is not only a wonderful movie, high-spirited and intelligent, but something of a production triumph as well."

However, others were disappointed with the film, especially given its distinguished cast. Many critics singled out Gibson's performance as bland, particularly when compared to the performances given by Clark Gable and Marlon Brando in two earlier adaptations. Vincent Canby of The New York Times stated, "Both Bligh and Christian are unfinished characters in a screenplay that may or may not have been tampered with... The movie seems to have been planned, written, acted, shot and edited by people who were constantly being over-ruled by other people. It's totally lifeless. The film was entered into the 1984 Cannes Film Festival.

Colin Greenland reviewed The Bounty for Imagine magazine, and stated that "By concentrating on the deadlock of the characters and the inevitable explosion, director Roger Donaldson has left many things unexamined: the Tahitians are not allowed to be much more than stereotype happy savages, for example. But his film is a powerful vision of the hell – and the wild beauty – of the high seas."

Anthony Hopkins later said "It was such a sad mess of a film, such a botched job. Yet I'd put so much time and effort into the role. So right then and there I decided: Never again. I will no longer invest so much effort in something over which I have no control. It's too frustrating. That film was a sort of turning point for me. For years I'd been trying to cultivate a don't-give-a-damn attitude. After watching `The Bounty' I knew I had it." He and Donaldson later worked together on The World's Fastest Indian.

See also 
 Mutiny on the Bounty
Mutiny on the Bounty (novel)
The Mutiny of the Bounty (1916 film)
In the Wake of the Bounty (1933 film) starring Errol Flynn as Fletcher Christian
Mutiny on the Bounty (1935 film) starring Charles Laughton and Clark Gable
Mutiny on the Bounty (1962 film) starring Marlon Brando

References

External links 
 
 
 
 
 Mutiny on the Bounty – review of 1935, 1962 and 1984 films
 Movie stills
 Official website of the Replica HMS Bounty in Hong Kong
 Film Review: The Bounty

1984 films
1984 drama films
1980s historical films
1980s adventure drama films
British drama films
British historical films
British independent films
Drama films based on actual events
1980s English-language films
Films set in 1787
Films set in 1788
Films about HMS Bounty
Films directed by Roger Donaldson
Films scored by Vangelis
Films set on islands
Films shot in French Polynesia
Films shot in New Zealand
Films produced by Dino De Laurentiis
Military courtroom films
Orion Pictures films
Seafaring films
Seafaring films based on actual events
Films with screenplays by Robert Bolt
Films set on ships
1980s British films